Maria Sadowska (born 27 June 1976 in Warsaw), also credited as Marysia Sadowska or simply as Marysia, is a Polish pop singer, music producer, screenwriter and film director.

Career

Early life
Sadowska was born in the capital of Poland, Warsaw, to her father, a composer, and her mother, a jazz singer. She debuted as a singer at the age of 14, and produced a musical, at the age of 17, where she wrote and composed its theme music and played the main role.

1990s

Sadowska released her first album Jutro in 1995. Two years later, in 1997, she released her second and third albums, Lucky Star and Crazy, exclusively in Japan. The latter's title track was featured on Dancemania's seventh issue, and two songs from Lucky Star, "Maybe Baby" and "Lucky Star", were featured respectively on Dancemania 8 and Dancemania 9.

2000s
In 2004, Sadowska released her fourth, jazz-dance-orientated album, Marysia Sadowska, which reached number 38 on the Polish OLiS chart.

Her fifth album, Tribute to Komeda, was literally a tribute album to Krzysztof Komeda. In its release year of 2006, the album reached No. 11 on OLiS' chart and was certified gold. The next year, 2007, she appeared on the British TV show Dancing on Ice, and released her sixth album Gwiazda dla każdego.

The 2009 album Spis treści featured her tenth single "Jest dobrze". Spis treści was her first completely self-produced album.

2010s
Her debut feature film Women's Day (Dzień kobiet) was released in 2013 and received the main award at the 22nd Film Festival Cottbus.

Sadowska was the judge of the third and fourth season of Polish TV show The Voice of Poland, with participants from her team winning twice. She returned to judging for the show's sixth season, and won again.

In 2019, Maria Sadowska took part in TVN's reality show Agent – Gwiazdy and she played the role of the title character – the Mole (pol. Agent).

Personal life
Sadowska is the daughter of composer Krzysztof Sadowski and singer Liliana Urbańska. She earned a second degree in piano at the Fryderyk Chopin Academy of Music in Warsaw soon after the releases of Lucky Star and Crazy. She also graduated from the Lodz Film School in 2002.

Discography

Albums

Cover albums

Soundtrack albums

Extended plays

References

External links
Official website 
Official MySpace
Official YouTube channel

Polish screenwriters
Musicians from Warsaw
Chopin University of Music alumni
1976 births
Living people
Polish jazz singers
Polish pop singers
English-language singers from Poland
21st-century Polish singers
21st-century Polish women singers
Polish women screenwriters